Hypatopa inunctella is a moth in the family Blastobasidae. It is found in most of Europe (except Iceland, Ireland, Great Britain, Norway, Portugal and most of the Balkan Peninsula).

The wingspan is 14–15 mm. Adults are on wing from July to August in one generation per year.

The larvae feed on plant material.

References

External links

 Images representing Hypatopa inunctella at Consortium for the Barcode of Life

Moths described in 1839
Hypatopa
Moths of Europe
Moths of Asia